This is a list of Turkish football transfers in the 2021 summer transfer window by club. Only clubs in the 2021–22 Süper Lig are included.

Süper Lig

Adana Demirspor

In:

Out:

Alanyaspor

In:

Out:

Altay

In:

Out:

Antalyaspor

In:

Out:

Beşiktaş

In:

Out:

Çaykur Rizespor

In:

Out:

Fatih Karagümrük

In:

Out:

Fenerbahçe

In:

Out:

Galatasaray

In:

Out:

Gaziantep

In:

Out:

Giresunspor

In:

Out:

Göztepe

In:

Out:

Hatayspor

In:

Out:

İstanbul Başakşehir

In:

Out:

Kasımpaşa

In:

Out:

Kayserispor

In:

Out:

Konyaspor

In:

Out:

Sivasspor

In:

Out:

Trabzonspor

In:

Out:

Yeni Malatyaspor

In:

Out:

References

Transfers
Turkey
2021